The Memorial to the Murdered Members of the Reichstag is a memorial in Berlin, Germany. The memorial is located in front of the Reichstag building and commemorates the 96 members of the parliament who died unnaturally between 1933 and 1945 (1948). The idea of creating the monument started in the 1980s, and the memorial was erected in September 1992. It was designed by Dieter Appelt, Klaus W. Eisenlohr, Justus Müller, and Christian Zwirner. The memorial is made of 96 cast iron plates, with the names, birth and death dates and places engraved on the edges. It has been designed so that it can be extended if new names are discovered in the future.

Commemorated people

References 

1992 establishments in Germany
Cultural infrastructure completed in 1992
1930s in Berlin
1940s in Berlin
Cast-iron sculptures
Monuments and memorials to the victims of Nazism in Berlin
Reichstag building